Lepsius is a German surname. Notable people with the surname include:

Johannes Lepsius (1858–1926), German humanitarian
Karl Richard Lepsius, Prussian Egyptologist
Reinhold Lepsius (1857–1922), German painter
Sabine Lepsius, German painter

See also
55733 Lepsius, asteroid